47 Ursae Majoris d (sometimes abbreviated 47 Uma d) is an extrasolar planet approximately 46 light-years away in the constellation of Ursa Major. The planet was discovered located in a long-period orbit (38 years) around the star 47 Ursae Majoris. As of 2011, it is the outermost of three known planets in its planetary system. It has a mass of at least 1.64 times that of Jupiter. It is the longest-period planet detected by Doppler spectroscopy. The evidence of this planet was found by Bayesian Kepler periodogram in March 2010.

References

 

47 Ursae Majoris
Exoplanets discovered in 2010
Giant planets
Exoplanets detected by radial velocity